Richard Uniacke may refer to:
 Richard John Uniacke (1753–1830), abolitionist, lawyer, politician, member of the Nova Scotia House of Assembly and Attorney General of Nova Scotia
 Richard John Uniacke Jr. (1789–1834), lawyer, judge and political figure in Nova Scotia
 Richard G. F. Uniacke (1867–1934), British genealogist and librarian